Grand-Bassam is a town in southeastern Ivory Coast, lying east of Abidjan. It is a sub-prefecture of and the seat of Grand-Bassam Department; it is also a commune.  During the late 19th century, Grand-Bassam was briefly the French colonial capital of Ivory Coast. Because of its outstanding examples of colonial architecture and town-planning, and the juxtaposition of the colonial town with a traditional Nzema village, the historic center of Grand-Bassam was designated a UNESCO World Heritage Site in 2012.

In 2021, the population of the sub-prefecture of Grand-Bassam was 124,567.

Geography 
The town is divided by the Ébrié Lagoon into two-halves: Ancien Bassam is the former French settlement, facing the Gulf of Guinea. It is home to the grander colonial buildings, some of which have been restored. The district is also home to a cathedral and the Ivory Coast National Museum of Costume, located in the former Governor's Palace. Nouveau Bassam, linked to Ancien Bassam by a bridge, lies on the inland, northern side of the lagoon. It grew from the African servants' quarters and is now the main commercial centre of the town.

The town is the seat of the Roman Catholic Diocese of Grand-Bassam. The diocese's cathedral is the Cathédrale Sacré Cœur in Grand-Bassam.

History 

The name Bassam may come from an ancient African word for the mouth of the Comoé River. Inhabited by the Nzema people since the 15th century, the city grew into a profitable fishing village and a trading center. In 1843, after signing a treaty with the African ruler of the Grand-Bassam region, the French built Fort Memours on the banks of the river. This fort became the primary French trading point in the region, and after the Berlin Conference in 1885, became a base for exploration of West Africa by the colonoizers. In 1893, Grand-Bassam became the capital for the French Colonie de Côte d’Ivoire.

In 1899, the administration was transferred to Bingerville after a devastating bout of yellow fever, in which 3/4 of the population died. However, the town remained a key seaport until the growth of Abidjan from the 1930s. The town has the aura of a ghost town, since large sections have been abandoned for decades. In 1896, the French capital was moved to Bingerville, and commercial shipping gradually declined until it virtually ceased in the 1930s. In 1960, with independence, all remaining administrative offices were transferred to Abidjan, and for many years Grand-Bassam was inhabited only by squatters. Beginning in the late 1970s, the town began to revive as a tourist destination and craft centre.

In March 2016, the town was targeted in an Islamist mass shooting which killed 19 people.

Sports
Woody Cote d'Ivoire

Villages
The eight villages of the sub-prefecture of Grand-Bassam and their population in 2014 were:
 Azuretti (1 168)
 Ebrah (805)
 Gbamblé (341)
 Grand-Bassam (74 671)
 Modeste (1 981)
 Mondoukou (1 400)
 Vitré 1 (2 482)
 Vitré 2 (1 180)

References

External links

French West Africa
World Heritage Sites in Ivory Coast
Sub-prefectures of Sud-Comoé
Communes of Sud-Comoé
Ramsar sites in Ivory Coast
Ivory Coast geography articles needing translation from French Wikipedia